The 22nd Edition Vuelta a España (Tour of Spain), a long-distance bicycle stage race and one of the three grand tours, was held from 27 April to 14 May 1967. Janssen also won the points classification and Mariano Diaz won the mountains classification.

Teams and riders

Route

Results

Final general classification

References

Results on cyclebase.nl 

 
1967 in road cycling
1967
1967 in Spanish sport
1967 Super Prestige Pernod